Sir James Langham, 7th Baronet (31 January 1736 – 7 February 1795) was an English politician who sat in the House of Commons  from 1784 to 1790.

Langham was the son of William Langham and his wife Mary Drought, daughter of Anthony Drought. He inherited the baronetcy from his uncle Sir John Langham, 6th Baronet in 1766. He was sheriff of Northamptonshire in 1767, and in 1784 Langham was elected Member of Parliament for Northamptonshire, holding the seat until 1790.

Langham married Juliana Musgrave, daughter of George Musgrave (1717–1742) of Nettlecombe and Combe Sydenham in Somerset, and sister and heiress of Thomas Musgrave (1741–1766) of Combe Sydenham, Stogumber, Somerset. By his wife he had children including Sir William Langham, 8th Baronet, eldest son and heir; and Sir James Langham, 10th Baronet, younger son.

Langham died at the age of 59.

References

1736 births
1795 deaths
Baronets in the Baronetage of England
High Sheriffs of Northamptonshire
Place of birth missing
British MPs 1784–1790
Members of the Parliament of Great Britain for English constituencies